UNIOSUN Teaching Hospital ( formerly known as LAUTECH teaching Hospital) is a state owned medical teaching hospital located in Osogbo, Osun State, Nigeria to provide tertiary health care and support undergraduate medical students from Osun State University.

References 

Teaching hospitals in Nigeria
Medical research institutes in Nigeria